Carlos Alazraqui has been featured in various films, television shows, and video games. He is best known for voicing Rocko in Rocko's Modern Life and Mr. Crocker from The Fairly OddParents. He also voiced Spyro in the first Spyro the Dragon video game.

Live-action filmography

Feature films

Television

Voice-over filmography

Animation

Feature films

Direct-to-video films

Video games

References

Male actor filmographies
American filmographies